Joanne Taylor may refer to:
Joanne Courtney (born 1989), née Taylor, Canadian curler
Joanne Shaw Taylor (born 1986), British guitarist

See also
Joan Taylor (1929–2012), American television and film actress